Garmurt-e Nosrati (also Romanized as Garmūrt-e Noşratī; also known as Garmūrt and Garmūrt-e Ramaẕān) is a village in Kashkan Rural District, Shahivand District, Dowreh County, Lorestan Province, Iran. At the 2006 census, its population was 173, in 38 families.

References 

Towns and villages in Dowreh County